Canal de Navarrés is a comarca in the province of Valencia, Valencian Community, Spain.

Municipalities 

Anna
Bicorp
Bolbaite
Chella
Enguera
Millares
Navarrés
Quesa

 
Comarques of the Valencian Community
Geography of the Province of Valencia